Joseph Duchâteau (14 June 1885 – 4 May 1953) was a French weightlifter. He competed in the men's heavyweight event at the 1920 Summer Olympics.

References

External links
 

1885 births
1953 deaths
French male weightlifters
Olympic weightlifters of France
Weightlifters at the 1920 Summer Olympics
Place of birth missing